Michio Suzuki may refer to:

, Japanese businessman, inventor and founder of the Suzuki Motor Corporation
, Japanese mathematician